The Dibang Wildlife Sanctuary is one of the eight wildlife sanctuaries of Arunachal Pradesh, India.

Location 
The sanctuary is rich in wildlife. Rare mammals such as Mishmi takin, red goral, musk deer (at least two species), red panda, Asiatic black bear, occasional tiger and Gongshan muntjac occur while among birds there are the rare Sclater's monal and Blyth's tragopan.

Flora and fauna 
A new species of a  flying squirrel, has been recently discovered from the edge of this sanctuary. It has been named the Mishmi Hills giant flying squirrel (Petaurista mishmiensis). Dibang Wildlife Sanctuary is located fully or partly within Dihang-Dibang Biosphere Reserve

It is protected by the Department of Environment and Forest of Arunachal Pradesh.

References

External links
Dibang Valley Wildlife Sanctuary, Official Website.

Protected areas of Arunachal Pradesh
Wildlife sanctuaries in Arunachal Pradesh
Protected areas established in 1992
1992 establishments in Arunachal Pradesh